This is a list of television shows carried by Freeform and its predecessors, CBN Satellite Network / CBN Cable Network, CBN Family Channel, The Family Channel, Fox Family and ABC Family.

Original programming

Drama

Comedy

Reality

Syndicated programming

Upcoming programming

Comedy

Animation

In development

Former programming

Original

CBN era (1977–90)

The Family Channel era (1990–98)

Fox Family era (1998–2001)

ABC Family era (2001–16)

Freeform era (2016–present)

Syndicated

1977-1998

Live-action

Animation

1998-2001

2001-present

Programming blocks

Current programming blocks

Former programming blocks

Notes

References

External links
 Programming schedule at Freeform Official Site

 
 
 
 
Freeform